James Terry Smith (born February 10, 1986) is an American professional basketball player for Hermine Nantes Basket of the Pro B.

College career
Smith attended NCAA Division II school Mercyhurst University from 2004 to 2008, where he scored a total of 1,384 points in 105 contests, placing him as the sixth all-time leading scorer in Mercyhurst history at the time of his graduation.

Professional career
After concluding his college career, Smith launched his professional career with the NVV Lions Mönchengladbach in Germany’s second-tier league 2. Bundesliga, before embarking on a journey through European basketball with stops in several countries. He played in the Czech Republic (BC Kolin), Switzerland (BBC Monthey), Bulgaria (Samakov, Sofia), Ukraine (SK Cherkasy Monkeys) and Croatia (Sibenik), earning himself a reputation as a scoring point guard with the ability to get his teammates involved. In 2015, Smith joined Sakarya Isik Koleji of Turkey, before moving on to French powerhouse ASVEL Villeurbanne in January 2016.

He played for Armenian side BC Urartu, a member of the Russian Superleague, in the early stages of the 2016-17 campaign and was picked up by Joventut Badalona of the Spanish top-flight Liga ACB in December 2016.

Smith moved to the French LNB Pro A for the 2017–18 campaign, signing with HTV Basket. He averaged 10.4 points, 4.1 assists and 3.1 rebounds per game. He signed with Lions de Genève of the Swiss league on August 9, 2018. He signed with the Saskatchewan Rattlers of the CEBL on July 1, 2019.

References

External links 
 Profile at eurobasket.com
 Profile at acb.com

1986 births
Living people
American expatriate basketball people in Bulgaria
American expatriate basketball people in Croatia
American expatriate basketball people in the Czech Republic
American expatriate basketball people in France
American expatriate basketball people in Spain
American expatriate basketball people in Switzerland
American expatriate basketball people in Ukraine
American men's basketball players
ASVEL Basket players
Basketball players from Syracuse, New York
BBC Monthey players
BC Cherkaski Mavpy players
BC Kolín players
BC Rilski Sportist players
HTV Basket players
Joventut Badalona players
Liga ACB players
Mercyhurst Lakers men's basketball players
PBC Academic players
Point guards
Saskatchewan Rattlers players